Chaste Susanne (French: La chaste Suzanne) is a 1937 French-British comedy film directed by André Berthomieu and starring Raimu, Meg Lemonnier and Henri Garat. It is an adaptation of the 1912 operetta Chaste Susanne by Jean Gilbert, itself based on an earlier play by Antony Mars and Maurice Desvallières. It was made when the 1930s booms in operetta films was at its height.

Made at Ealing Studios in London, it was the French-language version of the British film The Girl in the Taxi. Henri Garat was the only actor to appear in both productions. The film's sets were designed by the art director Jean d'Eaubonne.

Synopsis
In Paris an academy dedicated to promoting virtue awards its annual prize, but accidentally gives it to the wrong woman named Suzanne. The recipient is in fact a dancer who performs at the Moulin Rouge and is conducting an affair with the potential son-in-law of Monsieur des Aubrays, the head of the academy.

Cast
 Raimu as Monsieur des Aubrays
  Meg Lemonnier as Suzanne Pomarel
 Henri Garat as René Boislurette
 Blanchette Brunoy as Jacqueline
 Serge Flateau as Hubert
 Jean Témerson as Alexis
 Blanche Denège as Madame des Aubrays
 Anthony Gildès as Dominique
 Charles Dechamps as Pomarel

References

Bibliography
 Oscherwitz, Dayna & Higgins, MaryEllen . The A to Z of French Cinema. Scarecrow Press, 2009.

External links
 

1937 films
1937 comedy films
1930s French-language films
British comedy films
French comedy films
Films set in Paris
Films directed by André Berthomieu
1937 multilingual films
French multilingual films
British multilingual films
Films based on operettas
Operetta films
1930s British films
1930s French films